Krchleby is a municipality and village in Nymburk District in the Central Bohemian Region of the Czech Republic. It has about 700 inhabitants.

References

Villages in Nymburk District